Jošanica may refer to:

Places in Bosnia and Herzegovina 

 Jošanica, Foča
 Jošanica, Konjic
 Jošanica, Tomislavgrad

Places in Montenegro 

 Jošanica, Montenegro

Places in Serbia 

 Donja Jošanica, Blace
 Gornja Jošanica, Blace
 Jošanica, Sokobanja
 Jošanica, Žagubica